Lee Jee Hoon (born March 27, 1979) is a South Korean singer and actor.

Career 
Lee made his debut on October 15, 1996, while he was still in high school, with the single "Why the Heaven". He had not been able to release a solo album since his 4 album released in February 2001. Instead of performing on stage as a solo singer, he and Kangta formed a project group called the "S" with their close singer friend, Shin Hye-sung.

In May 2004, Lee released a new album as a solo vocalist. The title song of the new album was "Trinity", a ballad sung with a shouting-like singing style. Female vocalist Lee Soo-young and Shin Hye-sung, a member of Shinhwa, participated in the new album by Lee.

He also acted in the movie, Lovely Rivals and Wet Dreams 2. His first major role was as Kim Jaewon's rival for Eugene's affections in Wonderful Life. He then starred in Hello! Miss and New Heart. He also starred in KBS daily drama You Are My Destiny opposite of Girls' Generation member, Im Yoona.

In March 2011, Lee signed with Japanese label EMI Music Japan. Lee performed as male lead Daniel, rotating with Um Ki-joon, Ahn Jae-wook, Song Seung-hyun of FT Island and Lee Sungmin of Super Junior in the musical Jack the Ripper from July 5 to August 14, 2011, at Chungmu Arts Hall.

In September 2013, it was announced that Lee had been cast as Fiyero Tigelaar in the Korean production of the musical Wicked.

Personal life 
In April 2021, Lee announced on his Instagram that he would marry his non-celebrity girlfriend. The wedding will be held in October 2021. But the wedding had to be postponed to November 2021 due to COVID-19. and the wedding will take place on November 8, 2021.

Discography

Studio albums

Filmography

Film

Television

Web shows

Radio shows

Music video appearances

Musical theatre

Awards 
1997년 02월 15일 <MBC TV 인기가요 BEST 50 1위> (First place MBC TV Best 50 Songs)
1997년 02월 19일 < KBS TV 가요 TOP 10 1위> (First place KBS TV Top Ten Songs)
1997년 02월 29일 < MBC TV 인기가요 BEST 50 1위> (First place MBC TV Best 50 Songs)
1997년 03월 2일 < SBS TV 가요 20 1위> (First place SBS TV Top 20 Songs)
1997년 03월 12일 <KBS TV 가요 TOP 10 1위> (First place KBS Top Ten Songs)
1997년 12월 4일 <스포츠 서울가요 대상 "신인상" 수상> (Best New Artist Sports Seoul Music Awards)
1997년 12월 14일 <일간스포츠 영상음반 대상 "10대 가수상"수상> (Il Gan Sports Award Top Ten Singer)
1997년 12월 14일 <KMTV 97 가요대전 "인기가수상" 수상> (KMTV 97 Gayo Challenge "Most Popular Singer")
1997년 12월 28일 <SBS TV 가요대상 "신인상" 수상> (Best New Artist SBS Music Award)
1997년 12월 30일 < KBS TV 가요대상 "인기가수상" 수상> (Best New Artist KBS Music Award)
1년 03월 10 일 MBC TV 음악캠프 1위 (First place MBC TV Music Camp)
1년 03월 31 일 MBC TV 음악캠프 1위 (First place MBC TV Music Camp)
2001년 04월 1 일 SBS TV 인기가요 1위 (First place SBS TV Popular Gayo)
2003년 10월 25일 MBC TV 음악캠프 "I SWEAR> 1위 (First place "I Swear" MBC TV Music Camp)

References

External links 
 Lee Jee-Hoon official homepage

1979 births
Jellyfish Entertainment artists
K-pop singers
Living people
People from Seoul
21st-century South Korean male actors
South Korean male film actors
South Korean male television actors
South Korean male stage actors
21st-century South Korean male singers
Hanlim Multi Art School alumni